Allen County Schools is a public school district in Allen County, based in Scottsville, Kentucky.

Schools
The Allen County Schools School District has one elementary school, one intermediate school, one middle school, and one high school.

Elementary school
Allen County Primary Center

Intermediate school
Allen County Intermediate Center

Middle school
James E Bazzell Middle School

High school
Allen County Scottsville High School

References

External links

Education in Allen County, Kentucky
School districts in Kentucky